Achosnich is a crofting township in Ardnamurchan, Argyle within the Scottish council area of Highland.  It is close to Ardnamurchan Point.

Achosnich is located at the end of the B8007 road which is the major road of the Ardnamurchan peninsula.

Climate
Like much of the British isles, Achosnich has a Temperate Maritime Climate, with mild, somewhat dry summers and cold, wet winters.

References

Populated places in Lochaber
Ardnamurchan